Dimitrie Dobrescu (1852 – February 13, 1934) was a Romanian politician.

After studying law at the University of Paris, he returned home and entered the magistracy, becoming a judge on the Ilfov County tribunal in 1883. Entering the Conservative Party (PC), he was chosen general secretary of the State Domains in 1884. Dobrescu was an adviser at the Bucharest appeals court in 1890. The same year, he became general secretary in the Ministry of Agriculture, Industry, Commerce and Domains, remaining until 1895. Subsequently, he headed the tax and claims office in the Finance Ministry.

In 1891, Dobrescu followed dissident conservative members of Junimea into the new Constitutional Party, later returning to the PC. Elected deputy in 1911, he became a senator the following year. Concurrently, from 1911 to 1912, he was prefect of police and mayor of Bucharest. From March to June 1918, he was Justice Minister in the cabinet of Alexandru Marghiloman. Immediately thereafter, he became Senate President, serving until November. In 1925, he became an adviser at the Court of Audit.

Notes

1852 births
1934 deaths
University of Paris alumni
Conservative Party (Romania, 1880–1918) politicians
Presidents of the Senate of Romania
Members of the Senate of Romania
Members of the Chamber of Deputies (Romania)
Romanian Ministers of Justice
19th-century Romanian judges
Romanian civil servants
Mayors of Bucharest
Romanian expatriates in France